The 2000 South Africa rugby union tour of Argentina, Britain and Ireland was a series of matches played in November–December 2000 in Argentina, Britain and Ireland by South Africa national rugby union team.

In the meantime, the "Under-23" South African selection made another tour playing with second tier countries.

The Springboks tour

'Scores and results list South Africa's points tally first.

The Under-23 tour 

Scores and results list South Africa's points tally first.

2000 rugby union tours
2000 in South African rugby union
2000
2000
2000 in Argentine rugby union
2000–01 in European rugby union
2000–01 in Irish rugby union
2000–01 in Welsh rugby union
2000–01 in English rugby union
2000
2000
2000
2000